Charippus is a genus of spiders in the jumping spider family, Salticidae.

The genus name is derived from Ancient Greek Χάριππος, (literally, "graceful rider"), according to Thorell taken from Persian mythology.

Species 
 it contains eleven species, found in Asia:

 Charippus asper Yu, Maddison & Zhang, 2022 – Borneo
 Charippus bukittimah Yu, Maddison & Zhang, 2022 – Singapore
 Charippus callainus Yu, Maddison & Zhang, 2022 – Borneo
 Charippus denjii Yu, Maddison & Zhang, 2022 – Hainan
 Charippus errans Thorell, 1895 – Myanmar
 Charippus heishiding Yu, Maddison & Zhang, 2022 – China
 Charippus kubah Yu, Maddison & Zhang, 2022 – Borneo
 Charippus minotaurus Yu, Maddison & Zhang, 2022 – Borneo
 Charippus wanlessi Yu, Maddison & Zhang, 2022 – Borneo
 Charippus yinae Wang & Li, 2020 – China
 Charippus yunnanensis (Cao & Li, 2016) – China

References

 1895: Descriptive catalogue of the spiders of Burma p. 350
  (2000). An Introduction to the Spiders of South East Asia. Malaysian Nature Society, United Selangor Press Sdn. Bhd.

Further reading
  (1895): Descriptive catalogue of the spiders of Burma. London: 1-406.
  (1901): Histoire naturelle des araignées. Paris, 2: 381-668. (in French)
  (1984): Atlas rysunków diagnostycznych mniej znanych Salticidae (Araneae). Wyzsza Szkola Rolniczo-Pedagogiczna, Siedlcach 2: 1-177. (in Polish)
  (1988): A revision of the spider group Astieae (Araneae: Salticidae) in the Australian region. New Zealand J. Zool. 15: 81-172.

External links
 Diagnostic drawings of C. errans

Salticidae
Spiders of Asia